Matthias Olubori Ayodluwa Fanimo (born 28 January 1994) is an English professional footballer who plays as a right winger for Slovenian PrvaLiga club Koper.

Club career

West Ham United
A youth team player, Fanimo signed his first professional contract with West Ham United in the summer of 2011. He made his first team debut for West Ham on 28 August 2012 against Crewe Alexandra in the Football League Cup coming on as a 60th-minute substitute for Matthew Taylor. West Ham won the match 2–0.

Fanimo was released by West Ham on 2 February 2015.

Tranmere Rovers
In September 2014, Fanimo signed on loan for Tranmere Rovers. He made only one appearance for Tranmere, coming on as an 80th-minute substitute for Jake Kirby in a 1–0 away defeat by Carlisle United on 27 September 2014.

Margate
On 27 June 2016, Fanimo signed with Margate.

Drava Ptuj
On 16 January 2018, Fanimo signed with Slovenian Second League club Drava Ptuj.

Mladost Doboj Kakanj
On 16 January 2019, Fanimo left Drava and signed a two-and-a-half year contract with Bosnian Premier League club Mladost Doboj Kakanj.

He made his official debut for Mladost on 23 February 2019 in a 1–0 win over GOŠK Gabela. Fanimo scored his first goal for Mladost on 20 April 2019, in a 3–1 home win against GOŠK Gabela.

Sarajevo
On 24 July 2020, Fanimo signed a three-year contract with Sarajevo for an alleged transfer fee of €50,000. He made his official debut for the club in a league match against Krupa on 2 August 2020. Fanimo scored his first goal for Sarajevo on 20 September 2020, against Sloboda Tuzla. He won his first trophy with the club on 26 May 2021, after beating Borac Banja Luka in the 2020–21 Bosnian Cup final.

In February 2022, Sarajevo terminated its contract with Fanimo due to his alleged indiscipline.

Slaven Belupo
In June 2022, Fanimo joined Croatian Football League club Slaven Belupo on a free transfer. He made nine league appearances for the team in the first part of the 2022–23 season, before leaving the club in December 2022 following the termination of his contract by mutual consent.

Koper
On 14 December 2022, Fanimo returned to Slovenia and signed a contract with Slovenian top division side Koper until June 2024.

International career
Fanimo has played for England at under-16, under-17, and the under-18 level. He made his debut for the under-16 side on 28 November 2008 against Scotland U16 in the 2008 Victory Shield which England won 2–0 and in doing so, winning the shield. Fanimo was then given the captain's armband for the 2009 Victory Shield by Kenny Swain and he then scored his first goal at U16 level against Northern Ireland on 5 November 2009 in the 82nd minute as England went on to win 2–0.

Fanimo then made his debut at under-17 level on 3 August 2010 against Finland, and his under-18 debut in November 2011 against Slovakia.

Honours
Sarajevo
Bosnian Cup: 2020–21

References

External links

1994 births
Living people
Footballers from the London Borough of Lambeth
English footballers
Association football wingers
Black British sportspeople
England youth international footballers
English expatriate footballers
West Ham United F.C. players
Tranmere Rovers F.C. players
Bishop's Stortford F.C. players
Eastleigh F.C. players
Margate F.C. players
Hornchurch F.C. players
NK Drava Ptuj (2004) players
FK Mladost Doboj Kakanj players
FK Sarajevo players
NK Slaven Belupo players
FC Koper players
English Football League players
National League (English football) players
Slovenian Second League players
Premier League of Bosnia and Herzegovina players
Croatian Football League players
Slovenian PrvaLiga players
English expatriate sportspeople in Slovenia
Expatriate footballers in Slovenia
English expatriate sportspeople in Bosnia and Herzegovina
Expatriate footballers in Bosnia and Herzegovina
English expatriate sportspeople in Croatia
Expatriate footballers in Croatia